Hollywood Holiday is a comedy play by the British writers John Van Druten and Benn Levy. It is a satire on Hollywood scriptwriting, and sees a female playwright's script turned into half a dozen unrecognisable screenplays.

It ran at the New Theatre for twenty performances between 15 October and 31 October 1931. The original cast included Kay Hammond, Melville Cooper, Dennis Wyndham and Jean Cadell.

References

Bibliography

 Wearing, J.P. The London Stage 1930-1939: A Calendar of Productions, Performers, and Personnel.  Rowman & Littlefield, 2014.

1931 plays
Plays by John Van Druten
Plays by Benn Levy
Comedy plays
West End plays